The 1929–30 Ottawa Senators season was the club's 13th season in the NHL, 45th overall. The Senators finished third in the Canadian Division, making the playoffs, losing in the first round to the New York Rangers. It would be the original Senators last playoff appearance.

Team business
The Senators made a modification to their jerseys, adding an "O" logo to the chest of their jerseys. The club had last wore an "O" back in 1901 when they shared jerseys with the Ottawa Football Club.

According to Frank Ahearn, the Senators lost $CDN 32,000 ($ in  dollars) on the season. As told to King Clancy, this was the prime reason for the trade of Clancy before the next season. It was part of a pattern of Ottawa selling players off to cover losses.

Regular season
The Senators would continue to have some financial difficulties, and due to poor attendance against US-based teams, the Senators moved 2 home games to Atlantic City against the New York Americans and New York Rangers, along with two to Detroit, and a game to Boston.

Hec Kilrea would lead the club with 36 goals and 58 points, while King Clancy would add 40 points (17 goals and 23 assists) from the blue line.  Joe Lamb would provide toughness, leading the NHL with 119 penalty minutes, and would have a very good offensive season, finishing with 29 goals and 49 points.

Alec Connell would once again be steady in the Senators net, winning 21 games, earning three shutouts and be among the league leaders in GAA at 2.55.

Final standings

Record vs. opponents

Schedule and results

A – Played in Atlantic City, New Jersey.

Playoffs
The Senators went against the Rangers and lost 6 goals to 3, or 3–6.

New York Rangers 6, Ottawa Senators 3

Player statistics

Regular season
Scoring

Goaltending

Playoffs
Scoring

Goaltending

Awards and records

Transactions
The Senators were involved in the following transactions during the 1929–30 season.

Trades

Free agents signed

Waivers claimed

See also
 1929–30 NHL season

References

 
 
SHRP Sports
The Internet Hockey Database
National Hockey League Guide & Record Book 2007

Ottawa Senators (original) seasons
Ottawa
Ottawa